The 2014–15 season was Atlético Madrid's 84th season in existence and the club's 78th season in La Liga. Atlético competed in La Liga, Copa del Rey and UEFA Champions League.

Kits

Supplier: Nike / Main Sponsor: Azerbaijan (also 2015 European Games) / Back Sponsor: Plus500 / Sleeve Sponsor: Huawei

Players

Transfers

In

Out

Technical staff

Pre-season and friendlies

Competitions

Supercopa de España

La Liga

League table

Results by round

Matches

Source:Atlético Madrid.com

Copa del Rey

Round of 32

Round of 16

Quarter-finals

UEFA Champions League

Group stage

Knockout phase

Round of 16

Quarter-finals

Statistics

Squad statistics 
Updated 25 May 2015

Disciplinary

References

External links
2013–14 Atlético Madrid season at ESPN

Spanish football clubs 2014–15 season
2014–15 UEFA Champions League participants seasons
2014-15 Atletico Madrid season